Campos Novos is a city in Santa Catarina, in the Southern Region of Brazil. Campos Novos is a pioneer in production of pollen and the biggest grain and oat producer of Santa Catarina. 
The municipality invests also into fat stock and poultry farming.

Main ethnic origins are Italian, German, Portuguese, Polonese and Drovers.

History 
The Kaingang, an Indigenous people of southern Brazil, were the first inhabitants of the region.

The construction of the railway São Paulo - Rio Grande do Sul and the passages of the cattle drovers in the region mobilized many immigrants. Those migrations caused the creation of many villages at the Rio de Peixe river, like Bom Retiro, Capinzal and Videira. The arrival of the Italian and German settlers induced commercial and industrial activities in the 19th and 20th centuries.

Therefore, the city has a rich cultural diversity. It has even a community of descendants of African slaves.

19th century 

As many of the municipalities in the region, Campos Novos populated from the first attempts of colonialisation in southern Brazil, which began between 1825 and 1830, as the farmer João Gonçalves de Araújo coming from Curitibanos settled down in the region. Shortly afterwards came the gaúchos evading the Ragamuffin War. Many farmers originating from Lages
settled down as well, attracted by the huge quantity of terra and grassland. Then, the locality welcomed inhabitants coming from the states São Paulo and Paraná on the search of territory for cattle breeding.

In 1854, Campos Novos became a district of the municipality of Nossa Senhora dos prazeres de Lages, today Lages, with a total area of more than 5 000 km², according to provincial law nº 377, of June 16, 1854. Despite the many partitionings, Campos Novos is still one of the biggest municipality of Santa Catarina regarding the surface area.

From 1869 until 1881, Campos Novos was under control of Curitibanos. Then it became an independent municipality, according to provincial law nº 923, of March 30, 1881. Between 1850 and 1895, the province of Santa Catarina had only 11 municipalities.

20th century 
In the beginning of the 20th century, Campos Novos was embossed by the construction of the railway São Paulo - Rio Grande do Sul and by the Contestado War. From 1908 until 1910 many immigrants of various nationions arrived in Campos Novos: Poland, Russia, Lebanon as well as other settlers from other Brazilian states, especially descendants from Germany and Italy
after the Contestado War (1912–1916).

Geography 

Campos Novos is 370 km west of Florianópolis, the capital of Santa Catarina.

It is at the crosspoint of the federal highways BR-470 and BR-282 and the state highways SC-455 and SC-458.

Campos Novos has a central bus station with connections to Curitiba, Joinville, Chapecó and many other cities.

The next airports are in Chapecó (XAP) 155 km, Lages (LAJ) 145 km, Concórdia (SSCK) 95 km, Videira (SSVI) 55 km, Joaçaba (SSJA) 40 km.

The municipality is divided into following 7 districts since 2007:
 Campos Novos
 Bela Vista
 Dal`Pai
 Espinilho
 Ibicuí
 Leão
 Tupitinga

Economy/industry 

Campos Novos is the biggest grain producer of Santa Catarina. Many farmers are joined in cooperatives. There are also livestock and poultry farming.

The Occident's highest dam of that type with a height of 202 m (663 ft) is 30 km (20 mi) from the city center. It was built from August 2001 to July 2006 by Enercan. The 3 installed Francis Turbines have a power of 880 megawatts. The Campos Novos Dam produces 3,310,404 MWh per year.

Tourism 

The museum Fundação Cultural Camponovense (Campos Novos cultural foundation) better known as Casa da Cultura (house of the culture) exposes the historic archive of Dr. Waldemar Rupp and the Testament from 1877, related to the history of the community in the 19th century.

The church São João Batista on the Lauro Müller square is decorated by wooden sculptures and beautiful stained glass.

22 km from the city center is the Ibicui district, better known as Corredeira, where descendants of African slaves live. There is also the cemetery Invernada dos Negros.

References

External links 
 Municipalities of Santa Catarina - in Portuguese
 information from FECAM - in Portuguese

Municipalities in Santa Catarina (state)